Paolo di Segni (died 1437) was a Roman Catholic prelate who served as Archbishop of Reggio Calabria (1429–1437), Bishop of Gerace (1419–1429), 
and Bishop of Manfredonia (1414–1419).

Biography
On 4 February 1429, Paolo di Segni was appointed during the papacy of Pope Martin V as Archbishop of Reggio Calabria.
He served as Archbishop of Reggio Calabria until his death in 1437.

References

External links and additional sources
 (for Chronology of Bishops) 
 (for Chronology of Bishops)  
 (for Chronology of Bishops) 
 (for Chronology of Bishops) 

15th-century Roman Catholic archbishops in the Kingdom of Naples
Bishops appointed by Pope Martin V
1437 deaths